In organic chemistry, an ortho ester is a functional group containing three alkoxy groups attached to one carbon atom, i.e. with the general formula . Orthoesters may be considered as products of exhaustive alkylation of unstable orthocarboxylic acids and it is from these that the name 'ortho ester' is derived. An example is ethyl orthoacetate, more correctly known as 1,1,1-triethoxyethane.

Synthesis 
Ortho esters can be prepared by the Pinner reaction, in which nitriles react with alcohols in the presence of one equivalent of hydrogen chloride.  The reaction proceeds by formation of imido ester hydrochloride:
RCN + R′OH +  HCl → [RC(OR′)=NH2]+Cl−
Upon standing in the presence of excess alcohol, this intermediate converts to the ortho ester:
[RC(OR′)=NH2]+Cl− +  2R′OH → RC(OR′)3 + NH4Cl
The reaction requires anhydrous conditions.

Although a less common method, ortho esters were first produced by reaction of 1,1,1-trichloroalkanes with sodium alkoxide:
RCCl3 +  3NaOR′ → RC(OR′)3 + 3NaCl

Reactions

Hydrolysis 
Ortho esters are readily hydrolyzed in mild aqueous acid to form esters:
 RC(OR′)3 + H2O → RCO2R′ + 2 R′OH

For example, trimethyl orthoformate CH(OCH3)3 may be hydrolyzed (under acidic conditions) to methyl formate and methanol; and may be further hydrolyzed (under alkaline conditions) to salts of formic acid and methanol.

Johnson–Claisen rearrangement
The Johnson–Claisen rearrangement is the reaction of an allylic alcohol with an ortho ester containing a deprotonatable alpha carbon (e.g. triethyl orthoacetate) to give a  ester.

Bodroux–Chichibabin aldehyde synthesis
In the Bodroux–Chichibabin aldehyde synthesis an ortho ester reacts with a Grignard reagent to form an aldehyde; this is an example of a formylation reaction.

Examples

Trimethyl orthoformate and triethylorthoacetate are reagents. Another example is the bicyclic OBO protecting group (4-methyl-2,6,7-trioxa-bicyclo[2.2.2]octan-1-yl) which is formed by the action of (3-methyloxetan-3-yl)methanol on activated carboxylic acids in the presence of Lewis acids. The group is base stable and can be cleaved in two steps under mild conditions, mildly acidic hydrolysis yields the ester of tris(hydroxymethyl)ethane which is then cleaved using e.g. an aqueous carbonate solution.

See also
 Acetal, C(OR)2R2
 Orthocarbonate, C(OR)4.

References

Functional groups